Khvajeh Jamali may refer to:
 Khvajeh Jamali, Kazerun
 Khvajeh Jamali, Neyriz